Norman Nawrocki (born in Vancouver, British Columbia), is a Montreal-based comedian, sex educator, cabaret artist, musician, author, actor, producer and composer. Nawrocki together with Sylvain Côté were the founding members of "rock 'n roll cabaret" band Rhythm Activism. Nawrocki owns Les Pages Noires, through which he has published twenty albums and three books.

Early life and education 

Nawrocki was born in the East End of Vancouver to Polish/Ukrainian Canadian parents. He attended Langara College and Simon Fraser University, and co-edited the university's newspaper The Peak. He left without graduating.

Career 
In 1993, Nawrocki created I don’t understand women!, the first of several anti-sexist, sex positive, comedy cabarets on the topic of date rape, sexual harassment and violence against women.

In 2001, Nawrocki and Godspeed You! Black Emperor drummer Aidan Girt formed a duo called Bakunin's Bum, named after the anarchist philosopher Mikhail Bakunin. Their recording, Fight to Win! was released in 2001 on G7 Welcoming Committee Records as a benefit for the Ontario Coalition Against Poverty and featured spoken word by anti-poverty activists over instrumental music.

In 2004 he wrote, recorded and released his first solo album, Duck Work.

By the end of 2005 Nawrocki was teaching a course at Concordia University's School of Community & Public Affairs on The Arts, Radical Social Change and Community Economic Development.  As well as starring in Uncle Eddie's guide to art appreciation, by Donald Goodes.

On 25 February 2010, Norman Nawrocki has signed, together with 500 artists, the call to support the international campaign for Boycott, Divestment and Sanctions against Israeli apartheid.

Bibliography 
 Rhythm Activism live (1987) (Les Pages Noires)
 Resist much – obey little (1987) (Les Pages Noires)
 Rebel moon : anarchist rants & poems (1997)  (AK Press)
 Chasseur de tornades (1998) ;  (EDAM Montréal; Les Pages Noires)
 No masters! No Gods! : dare to dream (1999)  (Smarten Up! & get to the point)
 The anarchist & the devil do cabaret (2003) ,  (Black Rose)
 L'anarchiste et le diable : voyages, cabarets et autres récits (2006)  (Lux Editeur)
 Breakfast for anarchists (2006) (No Bar Code Press)
 L’Anarchico e il Diavolo fanno cabaret, il Sirente, Fagnano Alto (AQ) 2007, . Original Title: The Anarchist And The Devil Do Cabaret
 RED: Quebec Student Strike and Social Revolt Poems (2013)  (Les Pages Noires) Distributed in the United States and Europe by AK Press

Discography 
 I don't understand women! (1994) LPN012 (Les Pages Noires)
 Less Rock, More Talk: Spoken Word compilation (various artists) (1997; 2000) ; virus254 (AK Press Audio; Alternative Tentacles)
 Duck Work (2004) LPN018C
 Letters from Poland / lettres de Pologne (2006) LPN020C

Bakunin's Bum 
 Fight to Win! : a benefit CD for OCAP Ontario Coalition Against Poverty (2001) G7021 (G7 Welcoming Committee)

Bush's Bum 
 2TONGUE #5 (various artists) (2004)

DaZoque! 
 DaZoque! (2002) LPN016C (Les Pages Noires)

The Montreal Manhattan Project 
Draft 1.0 (2004) LPN017C (Les Pages Noires)

Rhythm Activism 
 Rhythm Activism (1986) LPN001 (Les Pages Noires)
 Rhythm Activism Live (1987) LPN002
 Resist Much, Obey Little (1987) LPN003
 Louis Riel in China (1988) LPN004
 Un logement pour une chanson (1990) LPN005
 Fight the Hike! (1990) LPN006
 Perogies, Pasta and Liberty (1990) LPN007
 Oka (1990) LPN008
 War is the Health of the State (1991) LPN009
 Oka II (1992) LPN010
 Tumbleweed (1993) LPN011
 Blood & Mud (1994) LPN013C
 More Kick! : live in Europe (1995) LPN014C
 Buffalo, Burgers & Beer : a 10 year retrospective (1995) LPN015
 Jesus Was Gay (1998) G7006 (G7 Welcoming Committee)
 Return of the Read Menace (various artists) (1999) G7010
 Take Penacilin Now (various artists) (2005) G7040

SANN : Sylvain Auclair & Norman Nawrocki 
 SANN : Sylvain Auclair Norman Nawrocki (2005) LPN019C

Videography 
 Musiques Rebelles Québec [Rebel Music Quebec] (various artists) (2002) (Productions Multi-Monde) 
 Uncle Eddie's Guide to Art Appreciation (2005) (Infringement performance)

Rhythm Activism 
 That's the way we tie our shoes : a recipe by Rhythm Activism (1996) (Unbend films; Les Pages Noires)
 Alive and kicking : the first ten years of Rhythm Activism (1997) (Les Pages Noires)

References

External links 
 Les Pages Noires
 Editrice il Sirente

Living people
Musicians from Vancouver
Writers from Vancouver
Musicians from Montreal
Writers from Montreal
Canadian punk rock musicians
Canadian anarchists
Canadian male novelists
Year of birth missing (living people)
Langara College people